Dax Milne (born June 23, 1999) is an American football wide receiver and return specialist for the Washington Commanders of the National Football League (NFL). He played college football at BYU and was drafted by Washington in the seventh round of the 2021 NFL Draft.

Early life and high school career
Milne grew up in South Jordan, Utah and attended Bingham High School, where he played basketball and football. He was a member of three state championship teams in football and two in basketball. As a senior Milne was named second-team 6A All-State by the Salt Lake Tribune after catching 23 passes for 408 yards and eight touchdowns. Milne opted to play college football at BYU as a preferred walk-on over scholarship offers from Southern Utah and Weber State.

College career
Milne played in 10 games with three starts in his freshman season and finished the year with 69 yards and one touchdown on 10 receptions. Milne was awarded a scholarship three weeks into his freshman year. He caught 21 passes for 285 yards and two touchdowns as a sophomore. Milne finished his junior season with 70 catches for 1,188 yards and eight touchdowns and was a finalist for the Burlsworth Trophy. Following the end of the season, Milne declared that he would forgo his senior season to enter the NFL draft.

Professional career

Milne was selected by the Washington Football Team in the seventh round (258th overall) of the 2021 NFL Draft. He signed his four-year rookie contract on May 13, 2021.

Personal life
Milne's father, Darren, played college baseball at BYU and later Minor League Baseball in the Detroit Tigers organization.

Milne has been friends with New York Jets quarterback and former BYU Cougars teammate Zach Wilson since childhood.

References

External links

Washington Commanders bio
BYU Cougars bio

1999 births
Living people
American football wide receivers
BYU Cougars football players
Washington Commanders players
Washington Football Team players
Players of American football from Utah
People from South Jordan, Utah
American football return specialists